There are several 2019 UCI World Championships. The International Cycling Union (UCI) holds World Championships every year. For 2019, this includes:

 2019 UCI Road World Championships
 2019 UCI Track Cycling World Championships
 2019 UCI Mountain Bike World Championships
 2019 UCI Cyclo-cross World Championships
 2019 UCI BMX World Championships
 2019 UCI Urban Cycling World Championships

UCI World Championships
UCI World Championships